Ismail Berdiyev, is a senior Muslim cleric from Karachay-Cherkessia, in the North Caucasus region of Russia. He gained worldwide attention when he claimed that “all women” should be subjected to the practice of female genital mutilation (FGM).

Biography
Ismail Berdiyev was born in 1954 in Kazakhstan, where his parents were expelled from North Caucasus with other Karachay people, when they were accused of collaboration with the Nazis in 1943 by Soviet regime. He returned to Karachay-Cherkessia with his family in 1957.

Controversies

Female genital mutilation
Berdiyev, the mufti of Russia's North Caucasus region of Karachayevo-Cherkessia, stated that FGM 'does not contradict the dogmas of Islam', and that this was a way to 'eliminate sexual depravity'. He also claimed this was a way to reduce 'lechery' and 'sexuality', stating that "All women should be cut, so that there is no depravity on Earth..." The mufti made his comments following publication of a report by the Russian Justice Initiative (RJI), stating that FGM is widespread in some parts of Dagestan. He was supported by Vsevolod Chaplin, a former spokesman for the Russian Orthodox Church.

References 

Russian Islamic religious leaders
1957 births
Living people